Emmanuel Boahene (born 28 March 2002) is a Ghanaian professional footballer who plays as midfielder for Ghanaian Premier League side Bechem United F.C. He previously played for Techiman Eleven Wonders.

Career 
Boahene played for then newly promoted side Techiman Eleven Wonders in 2019–20. In April 2020, after falling out with the management of the club his contract his contract with the club was terminated. He accused the management for treating him unfairly. In October 2020, after leaving Eleven Wonders, he was signed by fellow Ghana Premier League side Bechem United on a 3-year contract.

References

External links 

 

Living people
2002 births
Association football midfielders
Ghanaian footballers
Techiman Eleven Wonders FC players
Bechem United F.C. players
Ghana Premier League players